Hartala (or Haratale) is a village in Muktainagar taluka of Jalgaon district in Maharashtra, India. It is located near National Highway 53.

Geography 
This village is situated near the taluka seat of Muktainagar. It is situated on 274 meters above sea level on a hill. A 175 hectare freshwater lake is present to the southeast of the village. Nearby villages include Ghodasgaon, Muktainagar, Ruikheda, Taroda and Uchanda.

Demographics
According to the 2011 Census, the population of the village is 1097 families. It has 2422 males and 2442 females. The population below the age of six is 540, among whom 256 are girls and 284 are boys. Hartada has 1547 literate persons, out of whom 932 are female and 615 are male. It has 40 cultivators. The majority of the population speaks Marathi language.

Administration 
Hartala is part of the Muktainagar Vidhan Sabha constituency and Raver Lok Sabha constituency. It is in the Nashik division of Maharashtra and is part of the Bhusaval subdivision.

Education
Hartala has a government Marathi-language primary school for grades 1 through 4.

References

Villages in Jalgaon district